Vista Murrieta High School (VMHS) is a comprehensive, four-year high school located in Murrieta, California, United States. It is operated by the Murrieta Valley Unified School District. It opened in August 2003, relieving the overcrowding at Murrieta Valley High School, which had been the district's only comprehensive high school until that time. During the 2016–2017 school year, the school served over 3,500 students. The campus sits on  overlooking most of the City of Murrieta to the south.

VMHS is a four-year comprehensive high school accredited by the Western Association of Schools and Colleges (as of 2006).

This school was named "the most spirited school in the nation" from MaxPreps.com on March 31, 2009, as well as 2010. It was awarded the same title from Varsity.com for the 2015–2016 school year. It is now a California Distinguished School.

Golden Alliance 
The Vista Murrieta Golden Alliance is the high school's marching band and color guard. They won their first title at the 2016 Bands of America Long Beach Regionals in history. In addition, the band traveled to Indianapolis, Indiana in November 2016 to compete in Grand Nationals. They successfully got to semi-finals and acquired 14th place, with their show, Cinders. In addition, they won The Albert J Castronovo Esprit de Corp Award for their spirited excellence during their travels. A few weeks after the Golden Alliance returned from Indianapolis, they learned that they also won the Sudler Shield Award from the John Philip Sousa Foundation for their world class excellence. In November 2019, the band traveled to San Antonio, Texas and competed at the Bands of America San Antonio Super Regional Championships. They acquired 20th place out of 82 bands with their show, Luna.

Athletics

Notable alumni
 Curtis Bolton (class of 2014), American football linebacker for the Las Vegas Raiders
 Ambyr Childers,  American actress 
 Su'a Cravens, former American football strong safety
 Javelin Guidry, American Football Cornerback for the Philadelphia Eagles
 Ryan Navarro,  American football long snapper
 Michael Norman (class of 2016), American track and field sprinter
 Bradley Randle (class of 2009), American football running back for the Minnesota Vikings
 Sierra Romero, Mexican-American former collegiate four-time All-American, pro All-Star right-handed hitting softball player
 Sydney Romero, an American softball player
 Khalil Shakir, American Football Wide Receiver for the Buffalo Bills 
 Nick Stevens, American football quarterback
 A. J. Whitaker, American professional volleyball player

Feeder schools
 Elementary: Rail Ranch, E. Hale Curran, Avaxat, Antelope Hills, Lisa J. Mails, Alta Murrieta, Buchanan and Monte Vista Elementary Schools
 Middle: Dorothy McElhinney, Warm Springs, and Shivela Middle School

References

External links
 Official site
 Murrieta Valley Unified School District
 season records

High schools in Riverside County, California
Public high schools in California
Murrieta, California
2003 establishments in California
Educational institutions established in 2003